Pedro Orozco (born 1590) was a Roman Catholic prelate who served as Auxiliary Bishop of Toledo (1643–1678?).

Biography
Pedro Orozco was born in Alfaro, Spain in 1590 and ordained a priest in the Order of Friars Minor. On 14 Dec 1643, he was appointed during the papacy of Pope Urban VIII as Auxiliary Bishop of Toledo and Titular Bishop of Temnus. In 1644, he was consecrated bishop. While bishop, he was the principal co-consecrator of Juan Ortiz de Zárate (bishop), Bishop of Salamanca (1645); Jerónimo de Ipenza, Bishop of Jaca (1650); Juan Bravo Lasprilla, Bishop of Lugo (1652); and Juan Herrero Jaraba, Bishop of Badajoz (1678).

References 

17th-century Roman Catholic bishops in Spain
1590 births
Bishops appointed by Pope Urban VIII
Franciscan bishops